Pristimantis scitulus is a species of frog in the family Strabomantidae.
It is endemic to Peru.
Its natural habitat is tropical moist montane forests.

References

scitulus
Endemic fauna of Peru
Amphibians of Peru
Amphibians of the Andes
Amphibians described in 1978
Taxonomy articles created by Polbot